Mitcy Larue is a member of the National Assembly of Seychelles.  A teacher by profession, she is a member of the Seychelles People's Progressive Front, and was first elected to the Assembly in 1993. She served as the Minister of Family from 2018 until 2020.

References

Member page on Assembly website

Year of birth missing (living people)
Living people
Members of the National Assembly (Seychelles)
People from Baie Sainte Anne
United Seychelles Party politicians
Seychellois women in politics
Seychellois educators
Government ministers of Seychelles
20th-century women politicians
21st-century women politicians
Female interior ministers